Charles E. Clark may refer to:
Charles Edgar Clark, United States Navy officer
Charles Edward Clark, American lawyer and federal judge